Marolf is a Swiss surname which is a variant of the old Germanic given name Markulf. This surname is made of the two elements "mark" and "ulf." Marc derives from the Old High German word "marka," which means "border." The other element "ulf" is a derivative of the German word "wolf"--also meaning "wolf." Therefore, the name Marolf is generally translated as "Border Wolf" (HRC).  

The name may refer to:
Donald Marolf (born 1965), American scientist

See also
 Saint Marcouf
 marolf.org

Swiss-German surnames